Trenton is a village in Hitchcock County, Nebraska, United States. The population was 516 at the 2020 census. It is the county seat of Hitchcock County.

History
Trenton was platted in 1885 when the railroad was extended to that point. It was named after Trenton, New Jersey.

Due to Trenton's location near the center of the county, and its position on the Chicago, Burlington and Quincy Railroad, the seat of Hitchcock County was transferred there from the first county seat, Culbertson.

Geography
Trenton is located at  (40.176241, -101.013723).

Trenton Dam, impounding the Republican River, and its large reservoir called Lake Swanson, stand about two and one-half miles west of the city.

Demographics

2010 census
As of the census of 2010, there were 560 people, 264 households, and 134 families residing in the village. The racial makeup of the village was 98.4% White, 0.4% African American, 0.5% Native American, 0.4% from other races, and 0.4% from two or more races. Hispanic or Latino of any race were 1.6% of the population.

There were 264 households, of which 22.7% had children under the age of 18 living with them, 37.5% were married couples living together, 10.6% had a female householder with no husband present, 2.7% had a male householder with no wife present, and 49.2% were non-families. 43.9% of all households were made up of individuals, and 20.8% had someone living alone who was 65 years of age or older. The average household size was 2.02 and the average family size was 2.77.

The median age in the village was 48.1 years. 18.6% of residents were under the age of 18; 6.9% were between the ages of 18 and 24; 20.1% were from 25 to 44; 26.8% were from 45 to 64; and 27.7% were 65 years of age or older. The gender makeup of the village was 49.1% male and 50.9% female.

2000 census
As of the census of 2000, there were 507 people, 246 households, and 138 families residing in the village. The population density was 878.7 people per square mile (337.5/km). There were 301 housing units at an average density of 521.7 per square mile (200.4/km). The racial makeup of the village was 98.62% White, 0.20% Asian, 0.59% from other races, and 0.59% from two or more races. Hispanic or Latino of any race were 1.18% of the population.

There were 246 households, out of which 19.5% had children under the age of 18 living with them, 46.3% were married couples living together, 6.9% had a female householder with no husband present, and 43.9% were non-families. 38.2% of all households were made up of individuals, and 18.7% had someone living alone who was 65 years of age or older. The average household size was 2.03 and the average family size was 2.70.

In the village, the population was spread out, with 17.8% under the age of 18, 6.9% from 18 to 24, 22.7% from 25 to 44, 27.8% from 45 to 64, and 24.9% who were 65 years of age or older. The median age was 47 years. For every 100 females, there were 92.8 males. For every 100 females age 18 and over, there were 87.8 males.

As of 2000 the median income for a household in the village was $25,078, and the median income for a family was $34,271. Males had a median income of $26,094 versus $20,625 for females. The per capita income for the village was $14,057. About 13.7% of families and 15.0% of the population were below the poverty line, including 12.8% of those under age 18 and 8.5% of those age 65 or over.

Notable person
 Tom Baker, Nebraska state legislator.

See also
 National Register of Historic Places listings in Hitchcock County, Nebraska
 Massacre Canyon Battlefield

References

External links

 Village of Trenton

Villages in Hitchcock County, Nebraska
Villages in Nebraska
County seats in Nebraska